Jack Henley (December 6, 1896 – November 2, 1958) was an American screenwriter. He wrote for 80 films between 1932 and 1955. He was born in Ireland, and died in Los Angeles, California.

Selected filmography
 Hey, Pop! (1932)
 In the Dough (1932)
 Buzzin' Around (1933)
 How've You Bean? (1933)
 Close Relations (1933)
 Tomalio (1933)
 Art Trouble (1934)
 Ups and Downs (1937)
 Hoots Mon! (1940)
 That's the Ticket (1940)
 Two Yanks in Trinidad (1942)
 Dangerous Blondes (1943)
 My Kingdom for a Cook (1943)
 Bonzo Goes to College (1952)

External links

1896 births
1958 deaths
American male screenwriters
20th-century American male writers
20th-century American screenwriters